Det Bästa Av (The Best Of) is a greatest hits album by Swedish singer Darin Zanyar, released in November 2012 by Sony Music Sweden, two years after Darin moved to Universal Music Sweden.

Background
The album contains many of Darin's singles from his time signed to Sony Music. There are 16 songs from all four of his Sony released albums: The Anthem, Darin, Break The News and Flashback. Darin left Sony Music and signed to Universal Music Sweden in 2009.

Track listing

References

2012 albums
Darin (singer) albums